The James Robert Brudner Memorial Prize and Lecture at Yale University celebrates lifetime accomplishment and scholarly contributions in the field of LGBT Studies.  It is bestowed annually by the Committee for LGBT Studies at Yale University.  Recipients receive a cash prize and give a public lecture on the Yale campus in New Haven, Connecticut as well as a second lecture in New York City.

Overview
The prize is named for city planner, musician, and photographer James Brudner (1961-1998), a member of the Yale College class of 1983 and Stuyvesant High School Class of 1979.  Brudner died of AIDS-related illness on September 18, 1998.  Through his will he established the prize and lecture as "a perpetual annual prize for scholarship in the history, culture, anthropology, biology, etiology, or literature of gay men and lesbians or related fields, or for advancing the understanding of homosexuality as a phenomenon, or the tolerance of gay men and lesbians in society."

James Robert Brudner '83 was an AIDS activist, urban planner, journalist, and photographer. A man of wit and compassion, outsized knowledge and curiosity, Jim valued both academic inquiry and direct action. He spent 12 years as a policy analyst for the City of New York. He also earned an MA in journalism from New York University and wrote for various publications on gay- and AIDS-related topics. Jim became a member of ACT UP, the Treatment Action Group, and other organizations after the death of his twin brother, Eric, of AIDS in 1987. He worked on treatment and prevention issues with the National Institutes of Health, pharmaceutical corporations, and federal agencies. In his final years he devoted much of his time to traveling the back roads of rural America with a camera. La Mama Gallery in New York mounted an exhibition of his photographs in 1997. Jim died of AIDS-related illness on September 18, 1998 at the age of 37.

Winners 
 2019-2020 - Siddhartha Gautam (posthumously), in recognition of his work on behalf of LGBT rights and welfare in India.
 2018-2019 - Bill T. Jones,  choreographer, director, author and dancer
 2017-2018 - Carolyn Dinshaw, scholar of gender and sexuality in the medieval context
2016-2017 - Isaac Julien, artist and film director 
2015-2016 - Susan Stryker, academic, author, filmmaker
 2014-2015 - Richard Dyer, film studies scholar
 2013-2014 - Cherríe Moraga, Chicana writer, feminist activist, poet, essayist, and playwright
 2012-2013 - Samuel R. Delany, science-fiction author and English literature scholar
 2011-2012 - David M. Halperin, classicist and English literature scholar
 2010-2011 - Mary Bonauto, attorney and civil rights advocate
 2009-2010 - Edwin Cameron, human rights lawyer and justice of South Africa Constitutional Court
 2008-2009 - Cathy J. Cohen, political scientist
 2008 - Didier Eribon, philosopher (Eribon returned the prize in 2011: see his letter "I Return the Brudner Prize" on his personal homepage).
 2007 - B. Ruby Rich, critic
 2006 - Matthew Coles, Director, American Civil Liberties Union Gay and Lesbian Rights Project
 2005 - John D'Emilio, historian
 2004 - Judith Butler, philosopher
 2003 - Jonathan Ned Katz, historian
 2002 - Eve Kosofsky Sedgwick, English literature scholar
 2001 - Lillian Faderman, English literature scholar
 2000 - George Chauncey, historian

References 

 Event program, 2006 Brudner Prize Lecture, Yale University, April 2006

External links
Lesbian, Gay, Bisexual, and Transgender Studies (LGBTS) at Yale University

LGBT studies
LGBT-related awards
Awards established in 2000
Awards and prizes of Yale University